Dilling (also Delen, Warkimbe; autonym: Warki) is a Hill Nubian language spoken in the northwestern Nuba Mountains in the south of Sudan. It is spoken by around 11,000 people in the town of Dilling and surrounding hills, including Kudur. Ethnologue reports that Dilling is moribund, with only older adults speaking the language and not using it with their children. All speakers also use Sudanese Arabic. The Dilling call themselves Warki, while the Dilling speakers of Kudur call themselves Kwashe. Another ethnic minority that speak Dilling are the Debri people, a group of several thousands from South Kurdufan in Sudan

Dialects 
Dilling has one dialect – Debri, which is spoken on the mountain Gebel Debri, south of Ghulfan.

Phonology  
Dilling has 9 vowels a,e,ẹ,ḙ,i,ọ,ǒ,u and 21 consonants as following (Gebel Delen 1920:3):

Nouns 
In Dilling there is no difference grammatical gender in nouns verb forms, pronouns and relative terms, to express a gender in a person one adds expression to clarify such as for example korti (man) or ḙli (woman). These are added apposition without a connector. With animals the name classifies gender and species, ‘tẹ’ “female cow” and ‘tere’ “bull”. (Gebel Delen 1920:40-41)

Dilling does not have specific and non specific articles but it uses personal pronouns of the 3rd person sg/pl and is placed in front of the noun ‘tẹ id’ “the (mentioned) man”(Gebel Delen 1920:42). Exceptions are names and If the noun has an attribute afterwards it is either placed in front, between the noun and attribute or it is multiplied (Gebel Delen 1920:42).

Pronouns 
Personal pronouns are:

e->I

a->You

te/te->He/she/it

i->We

u->You

ti->They

Often times one only puts first person pronouns in front of the verb and leaves it out when referring to the 3rd person sg/pl or if they wanted to use it as a noun when they want to stress this part, they would put it in front of the verb. (Gebel Delen 1920:96)

Numbers 
Numbers 1-29 are written in Dilling starting from 30 numbers are either accumulating the numbers or taken from Arabic especially starting from 100(Gebel Delen 1920:90-92).

1 bēn oder ben

2 óren

3 tọcuṅ (töduṅ)

4 kẹmíńen

5 tišin

6 kwarten

7 kwálān

8 ẹddin 

9 wēn

10 búren

11 bure bé kǒ

12 bur óro kǒ

13 bur tẹ kǒ

14 bur kẹn kǒ

15 bur tís kǒ

16 bur kwártu kǒ

17 bur kwalā kǒ

18 bur ẹddu kǒ

19 bur wẹ kǒ

20 tarben

21 tar(be) bé kǒ

22 tar(be) óro kǒ

23 tar tē kǒ

24 tar kẹn kǒ

25 tar(be) tís kǒ

26 tar(be) kwártu kǒ

27 tar kwalā kǒ

28 tar(be) ẹddu kǒ

29 tar(be) wẹ kǒ

References 

Definitely endangered languages
Languages of Sudan
Nubian languages